The Madagascan yellowbrow (Crossleyia xanthophrys), also known as the yellow-browed oxylabes, is a species of Malagasy warbler, formerly placed in the family Sylviidae. Found only in Madagascar, it is the sole member of the genus Crossleyia. Its natural habitat is subtropical or tropical moist montane forests. It is threatened by habitat loss.

References

Malagasy warblers
Madagascan yellowbrow
Taxonomy articles created by Polbot